Mary Yamashiro Otani ( Mearī Yamashiro Ōtani) (July 5, 1923 in Berkeley, California – August 22, 2005) was a Richmond, California community activist. She was a student at UC Berkeley when she was forcibly removed to an internment center for Japanese Americans following the enactment of Executive Order 9066.  Initially, she lived with her family at the Tanforan Assembly Center in San Bruno and later at isolated Topaz War Relocation Center in the desert near Delta, Utah. Later a Quaker group persuaded the authorities to allow college-age students to continue their studies at East Coast schools. Yamashiro then attend Boston University where she met her husband Bill.

She was the summary writer for city elections voter guides. Yamashiro set up the Richmond Farmers Market and the Richmond Annex Senior Center. She monitored the Richmond City Council and the Ports Commission for the League of Women Voters. She was a Unitarian Universalist. She was one of six siblings born to an immigrant Okinawan family and, because of this, established a YWCA college fund for poor first-time college students of Southeast Asian descent.

References

External links
 Photo of the Japanese American internment center at Tanforan Racetrack

1923 births
2005 deaths
Activists from the San Francisco Bay Area
American Unitarian Universalists
Boston University alumni
Japanese-American civil rights activists
Japanese-American internees
American people of Japanese descent
People from Berkeley, California
People from Richmond, California
University of California, Berkeley alumni
20th-century American women
Women civil rights activists
21st-century American women